Woolton is a Liverpool City Council Ward within the Garston and Halewood Parliamentary constituency. In 2004 the boundary changed to incorporate a small part of Allerton ward and lost a small area to the new Allerton and Hunts Cross ward.

Councillors
The ward has returned six Councillors since the 2004 boundary changes.

Election results

Elections of the 2010s

Elections of the 2000s 

After the boundary change of 2004 the whole of Liverpool City Council faced election. Three Councillors were returned.

• italics - Denotes the sitting Councillor.
•bold - Denotes the winning candidate.

External links
Ward Profile - Woolton

References

Wards of Liverpool